Heuchera rubescens, with the common name pink alumroot, is a species of Heuchera.

The small perennial plant is native to the Western United States and northern Mexico. It grows in dry, rocky places.

References

External links
Jepson Manual Treatment: Heuchera rubescens
Heuchera rubescens — U.C. Photo gallery

rubescens
Flora of the Northwestern United States
Flora of the Southwestern United States
Flora of Northwestern Mexico
Flora of Northeastern Mexico
Flora of California
Flora of Nevada
Flora of New Mexico
Flora of Texas
Flora of the Sierra Nevada (United States)
Natural history of the Mojave Desert
Natural history of the Peninsular Ranges
Flora without expected TNC conservation status